Robert MacEwen (25 February 1928 – 28 August 2013) was a rugby union international who represented Scotland from 1954 to 1958.

Early life
Robert MacEwen was born in Oxford.

Rugby union career
MacEwen made his international debut on 9 January 1954 at Murrayfield in the Scotland vs France match.
Of the 13 matches he played for his national side he was on the winning side on 3 occasions.
He played his final match for Scotland on 1 February 1958 at Cardiff Arms Park in the Wales vs Scotland match.

References

1928 births
2013 deaths
Scottish rugby union players
Scotland international rugby union players
Rugby union hookers
Loughborough Students RUFC players
Alumni of Loughborough University
Cambridge University R.U.F.C. players
Alumni of the University of Cambridge
People educated at Bristol Grammar School
Rugby union players from Oxford